Charles Fleischer (born August 27, 1950) is an American actor, stand-up comedian, musician, and writer, best known for appearing in films such as Who Framed Roger Rabbit, A Nightmare on Elm Street, The Polar Express, Rango, Chip 'n Dale: Rescue Rangers, and We're Back! A Dinosaur's Story. He made a cameo in Back to the Future Part II and also reprised the role of Roger Rabbit in the Roger Rabbit theatrical shorts. After beginning his career on the comedy club circuit, Charles Fleischer's first big break in comedy television came when he made an appearance on Rowan & Martin's Laugh-In.

Early life
Fleischer was born in Washington, D.C., on August 27, 1950. He studied medicine at Southampton College, then part of Long Island University, before transferring to study acting at Goodman School of Drama at the Art Institute of Chicago (now at DePaul University).

Career

Fleischer is best known as the voices of Roger Rabbit, Benny the Cab, Greasy, and Psycho in Who Framed Roger Rabbit. After the film's success, he continued to perform the voice of Roger in several Disney television and theme park appearances at several of the Walt Disney Parks and Resorts, and in three follow-up shorts. Other voice roles for Fleischer include The Polar Express and We're Back! A Dinosaur's Story. Notable on-screen roles include Back to the Future Part II and Gridlock'd.

Fleischer had a recurring role on the 1970s TV series Welcome Back, Kotter as Carvelli, as Chuck on the ABC series Laverne & Shirley, and on the Disney cartoon series House of Mouse as the voice of Benny the Cab. Fleischer's first Laugh-In appearance was on January 15, 1973, where he played his homemade musical instruments made from lead pipe and shower wands. He then landed a spot on The Tonight Show Starring Johnny Carson on May 15, 1974. He was also a regular on Keep on Truckin'. He guest-starred on The Weird Al Show as a guy in a band. He also appeared on the short-lived Saturday morning show, Wacko.

Fleischer is the originator of the quote "If you remember the '60s, you really weren't there" which has been widely mis-attributed to various other celebrities.

He performed the role of a televangelist on "What God Wants, Part II", on Roger Waters' 1992 album Amused to Death.

He is also a musician and songwriter. He performed as a guest on harmonica with the group Blues Traveler at the Wiltern Theater in Los Angeles on November 22, 1995  and from December 10 to 15, 2002 at the Improvisational theatre of Connecticut Avenue.

From December 2010 to September 2011, he hosted his own weekly web show Fleischer's Universe on Ustream.tv, produced by Brad Wyman.

Charles Fleischer was inside Tropicana Las Vegas, giving an improvised comedy along with Bob Golub and Nick Aragon at the Laugh Factory from January 17 to 20 of 2019.

Personal life
Fleischer married Sheryl Strassman in 1977. Together they have two daughters, Rachel (b. 1980) and Jessica (b. 1982).

Filmography

The Death Of Richie (1977) as Brick (credited)
One on One (1977) as High School Student (uncredited)
Crisis in Sun Valley (1978) as Shuyler
Sugar Time! (1978) as Lightning Jack Rappaport
Die Laughing (1980) as Charlie
Hill Street Blues (1981) as Malibu
The Hand (1981) as David Maddow
Night Shift (1982) as Prisoner
A Nightmare on Elm Street (1984) as Dr. King
The House of God (1984) as Hyper Hooper
Deadly Friend (1986) as BB (voice)
Bad Dreams (1988) as Ron the Pharmacist
Who Framed Roger Rabbit (1988) as Roger Rabbit / Benny the Cab / Greasy / Psycho (voice)
Mickey's 60th Birthday (1988) (live-action & voice) as Stagehand Charlie / Roger Rabbit (voice)
Tummy Trouble (1989) as Roger Rabbit (voice)
Gross Anatomy (1989)
Back to the Future Part II (1989) as Terry
Dick Tracy (1990) as Reporter
Roller Coaster Rabbit (1990) as Roger Rabbit (voice)
Straight Talk (1992) as Tony
Carry On Columbus (1992) as Pontiac
Trail Mix-Up (1993) as Roger Rabbit (voice)
We're Back! A Dinosaur's Story (1993) as Dweeb (voice)
My Girl 2 (1994) as Cab Driver
Demon Knight (1995) as Wally Enfield
Bone Chillers (1996) as Arnie
Gridlock'd (1997) as Mr. Woodson
Ground Control (1998) as Randy
Permanent Midnight (1998) as Allen from Mr. Chompers
Rusty: A Dog's Tale (1998) as Bart Bimini
Genius (1999) as Dr. Krickstein
Big Monster on Campus (2000) as Mr. Stockton
Bel Air (2000) as Gus
G-Men from Hell (2000) as Martin / Pete
Buzz Lightyear of Star Command (2000) as Monumentus (voice)
Disney's House of Mouse (2001) as Benny the Cab (voice)
Balto II: Wolf Quest (2002) as Boris (voice)
The Backlot Murders (2002) as Henry
The 4th Tenor (2002) as Alphonse
Pauly Shore Is Dead (2003) as Himself (uncredited)
Balto III: Wings of Change (2004) as Boris / White Mountain Postmaster (voice)
The Polar Express (2004) as Elf General (voice)
Big Kiss (2004) as Berezovich
Zodiac (2007) as Bob Vaughn
Funny People (2009) as Himself
Chain Letter (2009) as Frank Wiggins
Rango (2011) as Elbows (voice)
Negative Space (2011) as Harry
Reality Queen! (2016) as Talk Show Host
Prop Culture (2020) as Himself, Episode: "Who Framed Roger Rabbit"
Chip 'n Dale: Rescue Rangers (2022) as Roger Rabbit/Chipmunks TV Announcer (voice)

References

External links

"All things are Moleeds" (TED2005) (18 minutes)
Charles Fleischer's Webshow Fleischer's Universe
Charles Fleischer's science paper.  https://arxiv.org/abs/1205.0518

1950 births
Living people
American stand-up comedians
American male film actors
American male television actors
American male video game actors
American male voice actors
American male songwriters
Male actors from Washington, D.C.
Songwriters from Washington, D.C.
20th-century American comedians
21st-century American comedians
Southampton College alumni